Hornoy-le-Bourg is a commune in the Somme department in Hauts-de-France in northern France.

Geography

It is the second largest commune of the Somme department (by area).

Places of interest
 The church
 The market hall
 The war memorial

Population

Personalities
 Countess of Dompierre d'Hornoy, Marquise of Florian, née Marie-Elisabeth Mignot, niece of Voltaire, was buried here in 1771.
 Jean-Pierre Claris de Florian, poet, often stayed at Hornoy.

See also
Communes of the Somme department

References

Communes of Somme (department)